Mungers is an unincorporated community in Marion County, in the U.S. state of Missouri.

The community has the name of William Munger, a railroad promoter.

References

Unincorporated communities in Marion County, Missouri
Unincorporated communities in Missouri